Brunswick Community College (BCC) is a public community college in Bolivia, North Carolina. BCC has more than 9,000 students taking classes each year. The service area of Brunswick Community College includes Brunswick and New Hanover counties with the main campus located in Bolivia. BCC contains two other campuses, one in Leland and one in Southport.

Athletics

The BCC athletic teams for both men and women are known as the Dolphins. The school is a member of the Carolinas Junior College Conference for athletics under the aegis of the National Junior College Athletic Association. The college offers men's and women's basketball, baseball, and softball.

BCC plays basketball on campus at the Fitness & Aquatics Center, while the baseball team plays at Founders Field and softball plays at Lockwood Folly Park.

External links
 Official website
 Official athletics website

 
Two-year colleges in the United States
North Carolina Community College System colleges
Universities and colleges accredited by the Southern Association of Colleges and Schools
1979 establishments in North Carolina
Educational institutions established in 1979
Education in New Hanover County, North Carolina
Education in Brunswick County, North Carolina
Buildings and structures in Brunswick County, North Carolina